Tabebuia maxonii is a species of Tabebuia native to the Dominican Republic. 

It is named for the botanist William Ralph Maxon.

References

maxonii
Flora of the Dominican Republic